Nieuwenhagen is a former village in the Dutch province of Limburg. It is now a part of the municipality of Landgraaf.

Nieuwenhagen was a separate municipality until 1982, when it became a part of Landgraaf.

Notable natives 
 Harry Kempen
 Joep Lange

References

Populated places in Limburg (Netherlands)
Former municipalities of Limburg (Netherlands)
Landgraaf